The 1875 Cúcuta earthquake (also known as earthquake of the Andes) occurred on 18 May at 11:15 AM. It completely demolished Cúcuta, Villa del Rosario (Colombia), San Antonio del Tachira and Capacho (Venezuela). The earthquake killed many Venezuelans in San Cristóbal, La Mulata, Rubio, Michelena, La Grita, Colón, amongst others, and was felt in both Bogotá and Caracas.

That day, the city of Cúcuta and the town of Villa del Rosario, in the Norte de Santander department (Colombia) and the municipalities of San Antonio del Táchira and Capacho, Táchira State (Venezuela) were destroyed totally by this catastrophic earthquake. Villa del Rosario was a historical and calm population. In 1821 had met in the main church (Historic church) to means to construct, the members of the First Congress of the Great Colombia, known as Congress of Cúcuta.

Still it is observed the rest of the church that collapse during the great seismic movement, the houses of that time in the zone were of the purest Spanish colonial style.

Death toll
The exact number of victims is not known; Spokane Daily Chronicle reported that the figure was as many as 2,500, while other sources say that the death toll was about 1,000. Early newspaper reports put the number at 8 to 10,000. The Evening Post wrote that 5,000 died outright with a further 9,000 dying from the after effects such as fever and lockjaw.

Affected areas
The earthquake covered 5 degrees of Latitude and was 500 miles long. Populated areas affected were, Villa of the Rosary, San Luis, Salazar, Woods of the Palms, Gramalote, Bochalema and San Faustino in Colombia. San Antonio, Capacho, San Cristóbal, the Mulata, Rubio, Michelena, La Grita, Colón in Venezuela. In addition it was also felt in Bogotá and Caracas.

See also
 History of Colombia
 List of earthquakes in Colombia
 List of historical earthquakes

References

Further reading 
 

Cúcuta
Earthquakes in Colombia
Earthquakes in Venezuela
Cucuta
Cucuta
Cucuta
May 1875 events